Hirao No.1 Tameike Dam is an earthfill dam located in Gifu Prefecture in Japan. The dam is used for irrigation. The catchment area of the dam is 76 km2. The dam impounds about 2  ha of land when full and can store 160 thousand cubic meters of water.

References

Dams in Gifu Prefecture
1916 establishments in Japan
Buildings and structures completed in 1916